Complete may refer to:

Logic
 Completeness (logic)
 Completeness of a theory, the property of a theory that every formula in the theory's language or its negation is provable

Mathematics
 The completeness of the real numbers, which implies that there are no "holes" in the real numbers
 Complete metric space, a metric space in which every Cauchy sequence converges
 Complete uniform space, a uniform space where every Cauchy net in converges (or equivalently every Cauchy filter converges)
 Complete measure, a measure space where every subset of every null set is measurable
 Completion (algebra), at an ideal
 Completeness (cryptography)
 Completeness (statistics), a statistic that does not allow an unbiased estimator of zero
 Complete graph, an undirected graph in which every pair of vertices has exactly one edge connecting them
 Complete category, a category C where every diagram from a small category to C has a limit; it is cocomplete if every such functor has a colimit
 Completeness (order theory), a notion that generally refers to the existence of certain suprema or infima of some partially ordered set
 Complete variety, an algebraic variety that satisfies an analog of compactness
 Complete orthonormal basis—see Orthonormal basis#Incomplete orthogonal sets
 Complete sequence, a type of integer sequence

Computing 
 Complete (complexity), a notion referring to a problem in computational complexity theory that all other problems in a class reduce to
 Turing complete set, a related notion from recursion theory
 Completeness (knowledge bases), found in knowledge base theory
 Complete search algorithm, a search algorithm that is guaranteed to find a solution if there is one

Music 
 Completeness, a 1998 collection of Miki Nakatani music videos
 "Complete" (Jaimeson song), a 2003 song by the British electronic music artist Jaimeson
 Complete (Lila McCann album), the third album by country music artist Lila McCann
 Complete (News from Babel album), a three-CD box set by the English avant-rock band News from Babel
 Complete (The Smiths album), a box set released by British band The Smiths on 26 September 2011
 Complete (The Veronicas album), 2009
 "Complete", a song by Kutless from To Know That You're Alive
 "Complete", a 2007 song by Girls' Generation from the album Girls' Generation
 Complete (BtoB album), 2015

Other uses 
 Complete set of commuting operators (or CSCO), a set of commuting operators in quantum mechanics whose eigenvalues are sufficient to specify the physical state of a system
 Complete flower, a flower with both male and female reproductive structures as well as petals and sepals. See Sexual reproduction in plants
 Complete market, a market with negligible transaction costs and a price for every asset
 Completion (oil and gas wells), the process of making a well ready for production

See also 

 Completion (disambiguation)
 Completely (disambiguation)
 Compleat (disambiguation)
 Wholeness (disambiguation)